Middletown Township is the name of some places in the U.S. state of Pennsylvania:

Middletown Township, Bucks County, Pennsylvania
Middletown Township, Delaware County, Pennsylvania
Middletown Township, Susquehanna County, Pennsylvania

Pennsylvania township disambiguation pages